"Domination of Black" is a poem in Wallace Stevens' Harmonium, first published in 1916 (and later in 1942), and selected by him as his best poem for the anthology This Is My Best.

Interpretation
The poem can be compared to imagist paintings of the period such as Klee's "Blaue Nacht", Klee's shades of blue replaced by Stevens' colors of the night. Stevens adds unsettling elements. The poem unfolds like a little horror show. A fire creates flickering images of the colors of bushes and leaves, which themselves turn in the wind. Also the color of heavy hemlocks "came striding", as from the river Styx ("the Stygian hemlocks", in Vendler's phrase). Ambiguous peacocks descend from the hemlocks. Then the poet notices outside his window the planets gathering isomorphically, "Like the leaves themselves", and the night came striding. The threat of darkness (death? suicide?) is palpable: "I felt afraid."

See also "Tea", which, like "Domination of Black", demonstrates "all the troping of leaves through the collection".

The composer Justin Connolly wrote a piece for solo bass clarinet entitled Tesserae F - "Domination of Black". In the published programme note, Connolly describes how the poem "re-cycles a number of images - hemlock trees laden with snow, the flames of a winter fireside, the harsh cry of peacocks - with the aim of creating by obsessive variation and repetition a scene in which it is the sound itself which provides the sense and sensation of the poem" adding: "My music has a similar aim."

The painter Joan Mitchell named an important work of hers Hemlock (1956) after what she termed "the dark and blue feeling" of the poem and its multiple references to the hemlock plant.

References

Bibliography
 Vendler, Helen. Words Chosen Out of Desire. 1984: University of Tennessee Press.
 Cook, Eleanor. A Reader's Guide to Wallace Stevens. 2007: Princeton University Press.
 Connolly, Justin. Tesserae F - "Domination of Black". 1999: Novello and Co, London

1916 poems
American poems
Poetry by Wallace Stevens